Where Gods Are Vain is a novel by F. J. Thwaites.

Plot
Derry Dexter, an Australian originally engaged in the copra trade on the Cocos Islands,  becomes a world-famous sculptor.

References

External links
Where Gods Are Vain at AustLit

1934 Australian novels
Novels set on islands
Novels set in the Indian Ocean
Novels about artists